Aspidoras depinnai is a relatively recently discovered catfish. It belongs to the subfamily Corydoradinae of the family Callichthyidae. It is found in the Ipojuca River basin of Brazil.  It grows to a length of 3.3 cm.  The corydora group of fish is varies massively and as a result many fish are hard to differentiate and define. There are no known procedures to follow for aquaria based breeding, but as with all cordora fish they tend to breed after heavy rainfall or when there is a drop in water temperatures or hardness.

Sources 
Planet Catfish
Copeia 2000 (no. 4) 1049 Figs. 1-5 
 

Callichthyidae
Fish of South America
Fish of Brazil
Fish described in 2000